Menslage is a municipality in the district of Osnabrück, in Lower Saxony, Germany. It is part of the Samtgemeinde Artland (the "collective community" of Artland).

References

Osnabrück (district)